Empress Ciyi may refer to:

Li Fengniang (1144–1200), wife of Emperor Guangzong of Song
Empress Qian (1426–1468), wife of the Zhengtong Emperor